Sunday Alhassan (born 11 November 2000) is a Ghanaian professional footballer who plays as a forward for Ghanaian Premier League side Accra Great Olympics.

Career 
Alhassan played for then King Faisal Babies before joining Accra Great Olympics. He made 4 league appearances with the club in the 2019–20 Ghana Premier League season before the league was put on hold and later cancelled due to the COVID-19 pandemic. In October 2020, ahead of the 2020–21 Ghana Premier League, he moved to Accra Great Olympics. He featured in just 3 league matches in the first round of the season before he was released by the club in March 2021.

References

External links 

 

Living people
2000 births
Association football forwards
King Faisal Babes FC players
Ghana Premier League players
Accra Great Olympics F.C. players
Ghanaian footballers